Pi-KVM is an open source project to provide a KVM over IP primarily based on the Raspberry Pi device.

About
The project consists of kvmd, the main Pi-KVM daemon using ustreamer as a MJPG-HTTP streamer. It also provides a prebuilt OS image based on Arch Linux.

External links

SSH Raspberry Pi
Pi-KVM on GitHub

Raspberry Pi